tabla! is a weekly English language newspaper in Singapore, published by Tamil Murasu. Launched on 10 October 2008, it marked its third anniversary in October 2011 with the launch of the tabla! Community Champion Award. tabla! also presented the Taj Express, a Bollywood musical that made its world premiere here in Singapore, on June 7.

The paper is named after the popular two-piece Indian percussion instrument, tabla.
30,000 free copies of the newspaper are distributed every Friday, excluding public holidays. It is available at all 7-Eleven outlets in Singapore. It provides local news to the Singaporean-Indian community (and PRs) and includes stories on education, property and transport.

See also
 List of newspapers in Singapore

References

External links
 

2008 establishments in Singapore
Publications established in 2008
Newspapers published in Singapore
SPH Media Trust